Michael J. Jones is an American computer scientist and inventor working as a computer vision researcher at Mitsubishi Electric Research Laboratories.

Education 
Jones earned a PhD from the Massachusetts Institute of Technology in 1997 under Tomaso Poggio.

Career 
Jones is the co-inventor, with Paul Viola, of the Viola–Jones face detection method, an ICCV 2003 Marr Prize and CVPR Longuet-Higgins Prize winner.

References 

Year of birth missing (living people)
Living people
Computer vision researchers
Mitsubishi Electric people
Massachusetts Institute of Technology alumni
American computer scientists